Thiruthangal Nadar College (Tamil:) is an Arts and Science college in the Kodungaiyur neighborhood of Chennai, Tamil Nadu, India. It was established in 1997 as a college for men was upgraded as a co-educational institution in 2002. It is a self-financing institution affiliated to the University of Madras.

Courses offered
UG Courses

PG Courses

Departments
Tamil
English
Mathematics
Computer science
Computer applications
Physics
Chemistry
Commerce
Management sciences
Accounting Finance & Bank Management
Criminology and Police Administration
Department of Library
Department of physical education
Diploma courses
Diploma in computer application
Diploma in Travel & Tourism

References

Arts and Science colleges in Chennai
Colleges affiliated to University of Madras